UKLA is an acronym for:

United Kingdom Literacy Association
UK Listing Authority, another name for the UK Financial Services Authority